Brachodes fallax is a moth of the family Brachodidae. It is found in north-western China, south-eastern Kazakhstan and Kyrgyzstan.

The wingspan is 18.5–29 mm. The forewings are grey with bright yellow scales. The hindwings are grey. Adults are on wing from the end of May to July.

References

Moths described in 1900
Brachodidae